Pierre Nolf (Ypres, 26 July 1873 – Brussels, 14 September 1953) was a Belgian scientist and politician.

In 1940, he was nominated for the Nobel Prize for Physiology or Medicine, but the prize was not granted that year. In 1940 he received the Francqui Prize for Biological and Medical Sciences.

External links
 Short biography of Pierre Nolf (redcross.int)
 Nomination for the Nobel Prize (nobelprize.org)

1873 births
1953 deaths
Flemish scientists
Politicians from Ypres